The naked miner bee (Andrena nuda) is a species of miner bee in the family Andrenidae. Another common name for this species is the nude andrena. It is found in North America.

References

nuda
Insects described in 1891
Articles created by Qbugbot